Taylor Graham (born June 3, 1980) is a former American soccer player.

Career

Youth and college
Graham attended Rio Americano High School and played five years of college soccer at Stanford University, registering as a walk-on his freshman year of 1998, and only appearing in two games in 1999.  After appearing in 18 games his sophomore season, Graham started every possible game his final two, winning first team All-Pac-10 his senior year, as he led the Cardinal to an appearance in the NCAA College Cup.

Professional
After graduating from Stanford, Graham was drafted 33rd overall in the 2003 MLS SuperDraft by the Kansas City Wizards. Graham was signed to a developmental contract, making two appearances and playing a total of ten minutes. In his second season Graham was given significantly more playing time, playing as both a right back and central defender. After a season in the USL First Division when he played every minute for the Seattle Sounders, led his team to the title, and was named USL Defender of the Year, Graham was acquired by the MetroStars, now New York Red Bulls.  He was released midway through the 2007 season and signed with his former club Seattle Sounders. He then signed with Seattle Sounders FC, a continuation of the Sounders in Major League Soccer. On May 26, 2010 he had his first appearance of the 2010 season in a friendly against Boca Juniors of Argentina, playing the full 90 minutes and putting up a solid performance.

Graham announced his retirement on December 2, 2011, after he was dropped from the roster by the Seattle Sounders.

International
Graham represented Puerto Rico in three international friendlies (including the team’s first win in 14 years) during early 2008. The national team coach Colin Clarke had misunderstood the requirements to play for Puerto Rican national side following a change to the eligibility criteria.

Previously, all U.S. citizens were eligible for Puerto Rico national teams, but now the player pool is restricted to players who have lived on the island for at least five years, meaning that Graham is no longer eligible for the Puerto Rico national team per federation rules.

International goals

Honors

Kansas City Wizards
Lamar Hunt U.S. Open Cup (1): 2004
Major League Soccer Western Conference Championship (1): 2004

Seattle Sounders
USL First Division Championship (2): 2005, 2007
USL First Division Commissioner's Cup (1): 2007

Seattle Sounders FC
Lamar Hunt U.S. Open Cup (3): 2009, 2010, 2011

Television
Graham appeared on The Price Is Right on June 24, 2009. In the showcase he spoke on one of the prizes which was a vacation to Seattle, to go to any 2 home games of Seattle Sounders and watch them play.

Personal life

After retiring as a player, Taylor Graham became Director of Business Operations for his former club, Seattle Sounders FC.

References

External links
 
 Seattle Sounders bio
 

1980 births
Living people
American soccer players
Sporting Kansas City players
Seattle Sounders (1994–2008) players
New York Red Bulls players
Seattle Sounders FC players
Stanford Cardinal men's soccer players
USL First Division players
Major League Soccer players
Puerto Rico international footballers
People from Fair Oaks, California
Soccer players from California
Sporting Kansas City draft picks
Major League Soccer broadcasters
Association football defenders
Puerto Rican footballers
Sportspeople from Sacramento County, California
Seattle Sounders FC non-playing staff